Year 1493 (MCDXCIII) was a common year starting on Tuesday (link will display the full calendar) of the Julian calendar.

Events 
 January–December 
 January 19 – Treaty of Barcelona: Charles VIII of France returns Cerdagne and Roussillon to Ferdinand of Aragon.
 March 1 – Martín Alonso Pinzón returns to the city of Bayona in Spain from the  voyage of discovery, sending the first notice about the discovery to the Catholic Monarchs (Christopher Columbus is delayed by a storm in the Azores).
 March 4 – Christopher Columbus anchors in Lisbon and completes his February 15 letter on the first voyage conveying the news of his discoveries.
 March 15 – Christopher Columbus and Martín Alonso Pinzón return to Palos de la Frontera, the original port in Spain from where they started the first voyage of discovery. 
 April 12 – Askia Mohammad I defeats Sonni Baru at the Battle of Anfao and usurps the throne of the Songhai Empire.
 May 4 – In the papal bull Inter caetera, Pope Alexander VI decrees that all lands discovered 100 leagues (or further west) of the Azores are Spanish.
 August 19 – Maximilian I succeeds his father, Frederick III, as Holy Roman Emperor.
 September 9 – Battle of Krbava Field in southern Croatia: Forces of the Ottoman Empire defeat those of the Kingdom of Croatia.
 September 24 – Christopher Columbus leaves Cádiz on his second voyage of exploration.
 September 26 – Pope Alexander VI issues the bull Dudum siquidem to the Catholic Monarchs, extending the grant of newly discovered lands he made them in Inter caetera.
 November 19 – Christopher Columbus lands on the coast of the island of Borinquen, which he renames San Juan (modern-day Puerto Rico).

 Date unknown 
 England imposes sanctions on Burgundy for supporting Perkin Warbeck, the pretender to the English throne.
 James IV of Scotland seizes lands of John MacDonald II, putting an end to the Lord of the Isles.
 Huayna Capac becomes emperor of the Inca Empire.
 Leonardo da Vinci creates the first known design for a helicopter.

Births 
 January 2 – Louis de Bourbon de Vendôme, French cardinal (d. 1557)
 January 6 – Olaus Petri, Swedish clergyman (d. 1552)
 January 9 – Johann of Brandenburg-Ansbach, Viceroy of Valencia, German noble (d. 1525)
 January 25 – Maximilian Sforza, Duke of Milan (d. 1530)
 January 26
 Min Bin, king of Arakan (d. 1554)
 Giovanni Poggio, Italian cardinal and diplomat (d. 1556)
 Ippolita Maria Sforza, Italian noble (d. 1501)
 February 9 – Helen of the Palatinate, Duchess of Pomerania (d. 1524)
 March 15 – Anne de Montmorency, Constable of France (d. 1567)
 April 11 – George I, Duke of Pomerania from the House of Griffins (d. 1531)
 April 25 – Giovanni Gaddi, Italian priest (d. 1542)
 May 5 – Alessandro Pasqualini, Italian architect (d. 1559)
 May 6 – Girolamo Seripando, Catholic cardinal (d. 1563)
 June 5 – Justus Jonas, German Protestant reformer (d. 1555)
 June 10 – Anton Fugger, German merchant (d. 1560)
 September 28 – Agnolo Firenzuola, Italian poet and litterateur (d. 1543)
 September 29 – Yi Gwang-sik, Korean politician and general (d. 1563)
 October 14 – Shimazu Tadayoshi, Japanese warlord (d. 1568)
 October 17 – Bartolommeo Bandinelli, Renaissance Italian sculptor (d. 1560)
 November 11 – Bernardo Tasso, Italian courtier and poet (d. 1569)
 November 11 or December 17 – Paracelsus, born Philippus von Hohenheim, Swiss physician and scientist (d. 1541)
 November 17 – John Neville, 3rd Baron Latimer, English politician (d. 1543)
 November 25 – Osanna of Cattaro, Dominican visionary and anchoress (d. 1565)
 December 9 – Íñigo López de Mendoza, 4th Duke of the Infantado (d. 1566)
 December 25 – Antoinette de Bourbon, French noblewoman (d. 1583)
 December 27 – Johann Pfeffinger, German theologian (d. 1573)
 December 31 – Eleonora Gonzaga, Duchess of Urbino, Italian politically active duchess (d. 1570)
 date unknown
 Jobst II, Count of Hoya (d. 1545)
 Simon Grynaeus, German scholar and theologian (d. 1541)
 Matsudaira Shigeyoshi, Japanese general (d. 1580)
 probable
 Jean du Bellay, French cardinal and diplomat (d. 1560)
 Robert Maxwell, 5th Lord Maxwell, Scottish statesman (d. 1546)

Deaths 

 May – Pietro Antonio Solari, Italian architect (b. 1450)
 May 10 – Colin Campbell, 1st Earl of Argyll, Scottish politician (b. c. 1433)
 May 14 – Nannina de' Medici, member of de' Medici family (b. 1448)
 June 14 – Ermolao Barbaro, Italian scholar (b. 1454)
 August 19 – Frederick III, Holy Roman Emperor (b. 1415)
 September 9 – Mirko Derenčin, Croatian leader
 October 11 – Eleanor of Naples, Duchess of Ferrara (b. 1450)
 October 22 – James Douglas, 1st Earl of Morton
 November 6 – Andrey Bolshoy, Russian prince (b. 1446)
 date unknown
 Ahmad Zarruq, Moroccan scholar and Sufi sheikh (b. 1442)
 James Blount, English soldier
 Isabel Bras Williamson, Scottish merchant (b. 1430)
 Kim Si-seup, Korean scholar and author (b. 1435)
 Martín Alonso Pinzón, Spanish navigator and explorer (b. c. 1441)
 Tupac Inca Yupanqui, Inca ruler of Tahuantinsuyu

References